All 4 U may refer to:

"All 4 U", song by Warrant from Belly to Belly
"All 4 U", song by Jax Jones from Snacks (Supersize)
"All 4 U", song by Killer Mike from Monster

See also
All for You (disambiguation)